is the third work of the Musha Gundam series.

The story continues straight from the previous work, telling the adventures of Alex in the time before the first work. Running period, 1991 to 1992.

Story 
The Daishougun defeated the mastermind of the Darkness Army - Kuromajin. On seeing Kuromajin, Alex regained his memory (lost as after-effect of time travelling). He then used G-Armour to go back to his time. Being told that the future had changed for the worst, Alex now chosen to be the Yondaime Daishougun, together with Nidaime and Sandaime went back to the past again. Together the four Daishougun defeated Kuromajin Yami Koutei and achieved true peace and world unification.

Characters

Gundam Army (頑駄無軍団, Gundamu Gundan) 
Musha Alex/ Neo Alex/ Yondaime Daishougun (武者荒烈駆主/新荒烈駆主/四代目頑駄無大将軍)
Design basis: Gundam NT-1
The protagonist this time round. Continued appearance from the previous work. Becomes one of the Gundam San Bushou by receiving the Sacred Treasure of the Earth Emperor. 
In the battle with the Resurrected Yami Shougun, Alex went back in time via the powers of Sandaime Daishougun and the Octogram Formation. He appeared in the time before Musha Shichinin Hen, where he wandered in an amnesiatic state. He met the brothers Hoou and Ikazuchi and was chosen by the Sacred Treasure of the Earth Emperor that they were carrying and became known as Neo Alex. With the brothers he fights the Darkness Army.
After Kuromajin is defeated he went back to his time via the time machine Musha G-Armour but what awaits is Kage Alex with the bad news of Sandaime Daishougun's death and the defeat of the Gundam Army. He is selected by the Gundam Crystal to become the Yondaime Daishougun and he then returns to the past to defeat Kuromajin Yami Koutei.

Past

Gundam San Bushou (頑駄無三武将)

Hoou Gundam/Gundam Daishougun (鳳凰頑駄無/頑駄無大将軍)
The user of the Sacred Treasure of the Sky Emperor. Elder brother of Ikazuchi. Journeying with his brother in search of "the Saviour who comes from a foreign land". Became the Shodai Daishougun, as predicted by the Scroll of Light, with the power from the Armours of Sky, Earth and Thunder. In the original history he was supposed to have died in the battle with Kuromajin but Yondaime Daishougun returned from the future with the help of the other two Daishouguns defeated Kuromajin Yami Koutei. His guardian beast after becoming the Daishougun is the Fire Phoenix which he combines with to become the Dai-Phoenix.

Ikazuchi Gundam (雷頑駄無)
The user of the Sacred Treasure of the Thunder Emperor. Hoou's younger brother. In the original history, after his brother died in the battle with Darkness Army, he will live as a peasant and raise his two sons(Musha and Noomaru). Later on he rebuilt the Gundam Army and become Shodai Shou Gundam.

Neo Alex (新荒烈駆主)
As above.

Bushin Gundam (武神頑駄無)
Design basis: Zeta Gundam
Warrior from Abram. Zeta's father.

Hyaku no Shin (百ノ進)
Design basis: Hyaku Shiki
Tactician of the Gundam Army. Decrypted the Scroll of Light and developed the G-Armour. Father of Hyakushiki and Hyakkimaru.

The Four Beast Kings (四獣王, Yon Jyu Oh)

Shishi Gundam (獅頑駄無)
Design basis: Double Zeta Gundam
Double Zeta's father. Entrusted his Shunbutsu no Jyu(a cannon) to Gundam Daishougun. His guardian beast is Shiro ShiShi(White Lion).

Ryu Gundam (龍頑駄無)
Design basis: Hi-ν Gundam
Nyu's father. Entrusted his Shinbi no Yari(a spear) to Gundam Daishougun. His guardian beast is Kouryu(Red Dragon).

Sai Gundam (犀頑駄無)
Design basis: Psycho Gundam
Psycho's father. Entrusted his Gouriki no Tate(a shield) to Gundam Daishougun. His guardian beast is Shisai(Purple Rhino).

Hayabusa Gundam (隼頑駄無)
Design basis: Gundam Mk-II
Mark Two's father. Entrusted his Hishou no Ken(a sword) to Gundam Daishougun. His guardian beast is Seishun(Blue Falcon).

Zaku Clan (殺駆一族)
Zaku (殺駆)
Design basis: Zaku II
Head of the Zaku Clan, fighting the Darkness Army with the Gundam Army. Goes by the name Zakuto later on. Governs the Country of Zion.

Giren (技連)

Dozuru (怒鋭)

Garuma (駆舞)

Troops
Flame Corps (火忍)
Proto Rick Dias (玄人斗里空出伊鮮姿)
Guncannon (頑巨砲)
Proto GM (玄人斗璽武)

Strike Force(突忍)
Proto Re-GZ (玄人斗吏我髄)

Infantry
Proto Ball (玄人斗暴留)

Present
Sandaime Gundam Daishougun (三代目頑駄無大将軍)
The Daishougu of Alex's time. When Alex returned Sandaime Daishougun had died in the failed battle with Yami Koutei.

Kage Alex (影荒烈駆主)
Alex's kagemusha. Told Alex the current situation when Alex came back.

Darkness Army (暗黒軍団, Ankokku Gundan)
Kuromajin/Yami Koutei/Kuromajin Yami Koutei (黒魔神/闇皇帝/黒魔神闇皇帝)
Kuromajin is the leader of the Darkness Army who is the Yami Koutei of the future. Was supposed to defeat Gundam Daishougun then later become Yami Koutei but with the appearance of Alex the past is changed Gundam Daishougun didn't die. Yami Kotei sensing the change when back intime to revive and fuse with Kuromajin (his past self) to become Kuromajin Yami Koutei.

Ryushou Hishou (龍将・飛将)
Kuromajin's right and left hand men. After their failure Kuromajin Yami Koutei fused the two together.

Waka Zakuto (若殺駆頭)
Brought to the past by Kuromajin Yami Koutei to help out. In the end he was killed by his then younger father.

Troops
Air Corps (飛忍)
Messala (滅殺荒)
Gaplant (虐風乱)

Mobile Artillery Squad (機動爆撃部隊)
Ga-Zowmn (我憎武)
Gaza-C (我坐士伊)

Strike Squad (雷撃部隊)
Doven Wolf (怒宇勉狼)
Byarlant (刃威悪乱)

Infantry
Galbaldy a (狩刃電威有破)
Galluss-J (我流速侍影)

Glossary 
Gundam San Bushou (頑駄無三武将)
Successors of the armours (the three sacred treasures) of the Tenku San Bushou.

Gundam Four Beast Kings (頑駄無四獣王)
The four who inherited the powers of the Tenku Four Beast Kings. The fathers of the later Musha Shichinin Shuu (Fuurinkazan Four Devas).

G-Armour (爾威武装)
The support mecha developed by Hyaku no Shin. Has the ability to time travel. Returned Alex back to his time.

Darkness Army (暗黒軍団)
Motif: Titans, Neo Zion
The army headed by Kuromajin. Besides Kuromajin, with Ryushou Hishou as core, there is the Strike Force, Mobile Raid Force and the Ninja Corps. Part of the surviving forces joint the Dark Army.

Anime
SD Sengokuden Tenka Taihei Hen (SD戦国伝 天下泰平編)
Theatrical release on March 1, 1993. It is about the events after Tenka Touitsu Hen, Yondaime Daishougun is the main character. It bridges Tenka Touitsu Hen with the Densetsu no Daishougun Hen.

Game
SD Sengokuden 2 Tenka Touitsu Hen (Game Boy)

References

Bandai Namco franchises
SD Gundam